The discography of Japanese recording artist Meisa Kuroki consists of two studio albums, two extended plays, five singles, two digital singles and nine music videos.

Albums

Studio albums

Extended plays

Singles

Other appearances

Music videos

References 

Discographies of Japanese artists
Pop music discographies